The Last Empress (Hangul: 뮤지컬 명성황후) is a Korean musical about the Empress Myeongseong of Korea, based on a historical novel by author Yi Mun-yol. It debuted in 1995 as South Korea's first original musical.  

The musical had Peter Casey as orchestrator and was composed by Kim Hee-gap, with lyrics by Yang In-ja (translated by Georgina St. George), and directed by Yun Ho-jin. The musical was produced by the Seoul-based Arts Communication (A-Com). 

The original production at the Seoul Performing Arts Center was expected to reach one million ticket sales by March 2007.

It played at the New York State Theater, Lincoln Center, in 1997 and 1998, to favorable reviews. It also played in London's West End in 2002, the Kodak Theatre in Los Angeles in 2003, and at Toronto's Hummingbird Centre in 2004.

See also 
 Empress Myeongseong (Historical figure)
 Empress Myeongseong (TV series)

References

External links 
 'Last Empress,' Musical Echo of Korea's History by Don Kirk, International Herald Tribune (March 27, 1998)
 Making of an Asian hit: A Korean royal tragedy in the Broadway style by Ricardo Saludo, Asia Week (December 18, 1998)
 New York Times review 1998
 New York Times review 1997
 LA Weekly review
 Asiaweek article

South Korean musicals
1997 musicals
Musicals based on novels